Michele Little (born c. 1960) is an American former actress, best known for her appearances in the 1980s and early 1990s. She retired in 1995 to raise a family after giving birth to a daughter with husband Brett Cullen.

Filmography
Radioactive Dreams as Rusty Mars (1985)
Appointment with Fear as Carol (1985) 
Out of Bounds as Crystal (1986)
Sweet Revenge as Lee (1987)
My Demon Lover as Denny (1987)
Bluffing It (TV movie) as Monica (1987)
The Return of the Shaggy Dog (TV movie) as Betty (1987)
The Facts of Life (TV) as Claire (1988)
Blue Heat as Anita (1990)
Blood Clan as Katy Bane (1990)
Father Dowling Investigates (TV) as Janie Oskowski (1990)
Mystery Date as Stella (1991)
Article 99 as Nurse Pierce (1992)
The Perfect Man (1993) as Melissa
Complex of Fear (TV movie) (1993)
Gambler V: Playing for Keeps (TV movie) as Amanda (1994)
Apollo 13 as Jane Conrad (1995)

References

External links

1960s births
Place of birth missing (living people)
Canadian film actresses
Living people